Ribulose-bisphosphate-carboxylase/oxygenase N-methyltransferase may refer to:

 (Ribulose-bisphosphate carboxylase)-lysine N-methyltransferase
 (Fructose-bisphosphate aldolase)-lysine N-methyltransferase